Sujan Mukhopadhyay (also known as Neel Mukherjee) is an Indian actor who works in Bengali language films, television and theatre. In 2012 he made his directorial debut with the film Ghete Gho. He is an active Member of the renowned Theatre Group Chetana. On 22 February 2016 his directorial debut, in the field of Theatre, Ghashiram Kotwal, which is an adaptation on Marathi play, was premiered. In 2018 he directed Don: Taake Bhalo Laage an adaptation of Dale Wasserman's Don Quixote which was translated into Bengali by Arun Mukhopadhyay many years back. This play marked the re-entry of Suman Mukhopadhyay as an actor after 25 years.

Filmography

Director 
 Ghete Gho (unreleased)
 Chocolate(2016)

Actor 
 Tonic (2021)
 Uma (2018)
 Haami (2018)
 Kiriti Roy (2016)
 Zulfiqar (2016)
 Byomkesh O Chiriyakhana (2016)
 Amoler Cabin (2016)
 Obhishopto Nighty (2014)
 Mishar Rahasya (2013)
 A Political Murder (2013) 
 Abar Byomkesh (2012)
 Chaplin (2011)
 Bye Bye Bangkok (2011)
 Tokhon Teish (2011)
 Target (2010)
 Chalo Let's Go (2008)
 Agnibalaka (2006)
 Herbert (2006)
 Teen Yaari Katha (2005)
 Nagardola (2005)
 Ekti Nadir Naam (2003)
 Two Months (2017) (Hindi short film)

Playback singer 
 Chaturanga (2008)

Theatre

Director 
 Don Taake Bhalo Laage
 Ghashiram Kotwal

Actor 
 Don Taake Bhalo Laage as Sancho Panza
 Ghashiram Kotwal
 C/O Eklati
 Kaurubasana
 Brain
 Natoktar Nam Ki
 Jagannath
 Marich Sambad
 Mephisto

Television 
 Devi Chaudhurani
 Byomkesh (2014 TV series) as Nandadulal Babu
 Chokher Bali as Binodini's husband
 Sokhi as Manojit
 Ichche Nodee as Abir Banerjee aka Pagla Ghora
 Jol Nupur as Surya Panigrahi
 Lokkhi Chhana as Capt Neel as host of the children's show
 Jibon Saathi  as Rick Sen
 Gangaram as Bablu Chatterjee
 Mon Phagun as Somraj
 Mou er bari as Mahitosh Sen
 Nabab Nandini as SRK

See also
Debesh Chattopadhyay
Arpita Ghosh
Suman Mukhopadhyay
Kaushik Sen
Bratya Basu
Shreyan Chattopadhyay

References 

Bengali male actors
Bengali male television actors
Bengali Hindus
Living people
Place of birth missing (living people)
21st-century Indian male actors
Male actors from West Bengal
Indian male film actors
Indian male television actors
Year of birth missing (living people)